Herbert Charles Pinder (born 24 December 1946) is a Canadian former ice hockey player who competed in the 1968 Winter Olympics. After his playing career he earned an Master of Business Administration from Harvard University and became a player agent.

Pinder was raised in Saskatoon, Saskatchewan. During his junior career he attended the University of Saskatchewan.

In 2017, the University of Saskatchewan gave Pinder a "salute" for his stature in the business community and for his volunteerism.  He received an honorary degree from the university.

Awards
CMJHL Second All-Star Team – 1967

References

External links

1946 births
Living people
American men's ice hockey centers
Canadian ice hockey centres
Canadian sports agents
Harvard Business School alumni
Ice hockey people from Boston
Ice hockey players at the 1968 Winter Olympics
Medalists at the 1968 Winter Olympics
Olympic bronze medalists for Canada
Olympic ice hockey players of Canada
Olympic medalists in ice hockey
Saskatoon Blades players
Sportspeople from Boston
Sportspeople from Saskatoon
University of Saskatchewan alumni
Vancouver Canucks (WHL) players